Kerala-no-dhoro (કેરળ-નો-ઢોરો), also known as Padri, is an archaeological site in Gujarat, India. Belonging to the Indus Valley civilisation, it is located on the southern coast of Kathiawar region. Dating from 3699-3792 B.C. known as Padri Culture or Early Harappan period a part of Sorath Harappan, Indus Valley culture.

Period 
Structures belonging to Early Harappan and Mature Harappan period were found in this site. A different type of pottery found in this place as well as at Somnath (Prabhas Patan), Lotershwar indicate an indigeneious tradition distinct from that of Amri-Nal, known from earlier occupations at Padri and Loteshwar (McIntosh, Jane).

Findings
Copper fish hooks, of exceptionally big size are found here, indicating large fish were caught. Well made, sturdy storage jars were also found at this site, which were used for transporting salt. A jar found at this place is decorated with buffalo horn motif and with a large figure in a ragged skirt and wearing a pair of buffalo horns. In early Harappan levels of this site, symbols similar to Harappan writing were found and such writings were also found at Kalibangan and Dholavira.

Structures
Rectangular houses, houses with rooms and workshops were constructed in Early Harappan Period. Houses constructed during Mature Harappan period were of mud bricks with floors being plastered with lime and dung; and these houses had storage spaces and hearths for cooking.

Salt production
This unwalled village is thought have involved with production of salt, by evaporating sea water.

See also

 List of Indus Valley Civilization sites
 Gola Dhoro
 Bhagatrav

References

Bibliography 
 

Indus Valley civilisation sites
Former populated places in India
Archaeological sites in Gujarat
Amri-Nal culture